The Mercedes-Benz W220 was a range of flagship sedans which, as the fourth generation Mercedes-Benz S-Class, replaced the W140 S-Class after model year 1998 — with long and short wheelbase versions, performance and luxury options; available four-wheel drive; and a range of  diesel as well as gas/petrol V6, V8, and V12 engines. Compared to its predecessor, the W220 had somewhat smaller exterior dimensions but offered greater interior volume, particularly in the long-wheelbase versions, and slightly less cargo volume.

Development began in 1992, with the final design, under the direction of Steve Mattin, approved in June 1995 and frozen in March 1996. The completed prototypes were presented in June 1998.

W220 production began on August 13, 1998, and C215 coupé production followed in 1999.  
Production of the 220-series totalled 484,683 units, slightly more than the production totals from the W140.

Production ended in late 2005, when the W220 was replaced by the W221 S-Class and the C215 was replaced in 2006 by the C216 CL-Class.

Styling

Steve Mattin's design was the first sketch drawn in October 1992 and developed into 1:1 scale by late 1994. In June 1995, the Daimler-Benz AG board of management approved Mattin's final design at 38 months before production. By March 1996, W220 program engineers completed the design freeze, 29 months before production start in August 1998. The W220 exterior design (especially headlights) was previewed by the Mercedes-Benz F200 concept in late 1996. Being a Mercedes flagship vehicle worldwide, the S-Class largely popularized the theme.

A facelifted version of the S-Class was designed in late 2000 and introduced in September 2002, offering a more refined front-end with a larger, more upright grille, transparent headlamp housings with sealed-beam projectors, and revised taillights. Much of the rest of the exterior remained largely unchanged from first phase W220 models.

Inside, the update addressed several of the issues in the COMAND system and other interior features. Exterior updates included a more upright grille angle, new transparent housing for the headlamps (replacing the earlier translucent versions), and restyled lower air intakes on the front bumper.

The S 600 series has a "V12" badge affixed to either side of the car, just forward of the front doors and back from the wheel wells.

Models

European Sales (for all versions of S-Class):

North American models
Approximate selection of US models. In the US, model years for the W220 were 2000, 2001, 2002, 2003, 2004, 2005, and 2006 (only some versions). Not all versions were available in all model years.

S 350 (in the US this was available in 2006 only; had 3.7L V6 and 5-speed Automatic transmission)
S 430
S 500
S 600 (naturally-aspirated or twin-turbo V12)
S 55 AMG (naturally-aspirated or supercharged V8)
S 65 AMG ( twin-turbo V12)

Some models had options for Sport package, Designo, and/or 4Matic.

In the United States the W220 S-Class was introduced in 1999 for the 2000 model year, replacing the W140. The type was noted as being the leader in the U.S. car market for luxury cars, and early reviews were mostly positive but noted the amount of money that could be spent on options. At the time, the US was the second biggest buyer of S-Classes, after Germany. In 1999, Mercedes-Benz sold 189,437 and hoped to exceed that the next year.
One automotive magazine spent several thousands on options for their review of the 2001 S-Class. After choosing an S 500, they added Distronic (a smart cruise control system), Active Ventilated Seats, the "Timeport" phone with a voice control system, and the sport package (AMG rims and trim). This increased the price from the mid US$70,000s to the $90,000s after delivery and taxes. Other US models available at this time were the S 430, S 500, S 55 (AMG model), and S 600 (the V12). A four-wheel drive system became an option for 2003 for the S 430 and S 500 along with mid-life upgrades that targeted a range of interior and exterior features. In the last U.S. W220 model year a V-6 was offered as the S 350. Another special option was called the "Designo", which matched special interior and exterior colors and materials. An example of this is that one such model used Elm wood in the interior. There were two designo additions offered, the Designo Espresso Edition and the Designo Silver Edition The twelve-cylinder S 600 included interior upgrades, including an increased amount of leather over more interior surfaces.

The W220 based S 65 AMG was also offered in 2006 concurrently with the new W221. The S 65 had a 604 hp, 738 lb-ft twin-turbo V-12 and other miscellaneous features inside and out. It retailed that year in the United States for about US$180,000. The V-12 had a displacement of 6 liters, in a single overhead cam, 36-valve configuration, and was paired with two turbochargers. The S 65 had four oval tail-pipes and AMG alloy wheels.

Specific versions

One of the most popular versions was the long-wheelbase S 500, with over 108,000 produced over the model run. On top of that, an additional over 13,000 all-wheel drive S 500 version were made and over 21,000 short-wheel base S 500 models. This works out to about 140,000 S 500 of all versions across all model years out of 484,683 of all W220 models over its production run. The W220's peak sales year was 2000, with 88,000 sold worldwide, but both 1999 and 2001 were close with well over 80,000 sold. Two unique models that had small runs were a factory produced 160 inch wheelbase "stretch limo" called a Pullman and a special security version called S-Guard.

The Pullman version was a Mercedes-Benz engineered version of the S-Class of this period (circa 2001), that went beyond the after market "stretch" to offer a host of advanced systems and enhanced comfort. One of those systems was the AMG Advanced Mobile Media System to support the concept of a mobile office from within the vehicle. Components of this system including 10.4 inch LCD monitors displaying data from a computer with mobile web access.  The system could also support video display, both from a DVD player or tuner to pick up broadcast; with two screen, it could display both at the same time. An additional re-chargeable battery allowed the system to powered independently for a half-hour with the engine off. The AMG developed media system could connect to the World Wide Web using HSCSD or GPRS at up to 43 kilobits per second.

The AMG Advanced Mobile Media System debuted in 1999 on the Mercedes-Benz S 55 AMG, which was noted for featuring a six-channel digital audio system. The system debuted on S-Class with 2001 Pullman model. AMG signed a cooperation agreement with Daimler-Benz starting 1990, producing special models of MB vehicles and became further integrated in this period starting in 1991 with the foundation of Mercedes-AMG GmbH various changes driven especially by the success of AMG models in MB lines and expansions at Affalterbach, Germany.

The S-Class Pullman was offered as the S 500 (V8) or S 600 (V12) and was jointly developed by Mercedes and AMG. The Pullman is  longer than the regular S-Class, providing  of space in the rear seat area. This also additional seating for up to seven-passengers, with two rear facing seats in between the front and back seats. In six-seat configuration the rear bench seat capable of three is replaced by two independent chairs. In addition to the AMG multi-media system, there is also a bar supporting the consumption of cooled beverages, small tables, and a barrier to the front of the vehicle that. Along with this barrier is an intercom from the rear seat to the driver area to support communication within the vehicle. Mechanically, the roof, exhaust, side-panels and chassis featured changes to support the additional length. A special feature for people working on the car, is that the side panels can be easily removed like doors.

Mercedes-Benz S 55 AMG

One model line of the Mercedes-Benz S-Class in this period was the AMG version S 55. The S 55 had a number of modifications over the stock W220 S-Class, and the changes were oriented towards higher automotive performance and more dramatic styling features compared to the regular models. The model name derives from displacement of the engine, a special almost 5.5 litre V8.

The additional power-boost came for the later model S 55 from pairing this engine with a supercharger. A supercharger is a forced induction system that compresses the air before in enters the engine, and uses air compressor powered by a belt connected to the engine. Other changes include enhanced brakes and wheels, with 14.2 inch brake discs at the front and 13 inch discs at the rear. The S 55 could of course be also equipped with Active Body Control, but this was not standard. The supercharged S 55 models had the Kompressor (Mercedes-Benz) badge on the side. For more about AMG models with this engine see
"55" 5.4 L V8 KOMPRESSOR.

Features added to the S 55 (US-spec):
Active Body Control (ABC)
Automatic Level Control 
Sport Mode
18-inch AMG alloy wheels with performance tires
AMG body kit including a new AMG front spoiler and rocker panels
6-disk capacity CD player mounted in trunk
Ventilated seats with automatic massage 
Bigger Brakes

Mercedes-Benz S 600

The S 600 was the main 12-cylinder engine model of the W220 body. The increased output of the engine enabled this W220 to keep up with a Ferrari 575M Maranello according to one automotive magazine of the era. The 2003 model was fitted with Michelin Pilot Sport tires with a Y rating.

The S 600 was also a model of the S-Class Pullman, an even longer wheelbase version that was 1 meter longer and supporting up to seven passengers and mobile office technology.

A limited run of S 600L facelift sedans were produced featuring the same suite of options as the S-Class Pullman coupled with AMG body styling and AMG alloy wheels.

Features included on the S 600 (US-spec):
Stitched leather and increased leather trim 
Leather Dashboard
Leather Tray
Leather Console
Leather Doors
Wood Shift Knob
Wood and leather trim on steering wheel
Alcantara Headliner
Four seats with heat and power operated 
Four-Zone Climate Control
Parktronic

Mercedes-Benz S 65 AMG

The S 65 was an AMG version of the S 600, with a twin-turbocharged V12 producing . One reviewer noted that it excelled at being a gran turismo (grand tourer) and averaged about 17 miles per gallon despite its size and equally large power plant.

The S 65 was noted as a special value on the used car market, given that, despite requiring the maintenance of less expensive models, it could approach a ten-second 1/4 mile, yet it retained amenities such as heated leather seats and multi-passenger seating. A popular aftermarket tuning kit was an ECU upgrade from Renntech since increasing engine output required no mechanical upgrades to the car. In 2021 a used example was sold for $111k.

Suspension: Airmatic & Active Body Control
The W220 was available either with air suspension which is a semi-active/adaptive suspension, or hydropneumatic suspension which is an active suspension, rather than the more common mechanical "springs and shocks" on most passenger vehicles. The car had an electronic stability control program and automatic slip control.

Airmatic
Airmatic, or AIRmatic stands for Adaptive Intelligent Ride Control and was not just an air suspension, but also electronic and software control system that actively adjust the level of dampening. This allows, for example, the car to automatically lower itself down at high speeds and keep the car balanced despite loads inside the car. The car can also be manually controlled to raise the car up if going for example over rough roads. The standard W220's have Airmatic.
The Airmatic main components are an air-pump, airlines going to each wheel, and four air-struts. The air pump is located in the front diver side behind a splash guard near the wheel. Mercedes-Benz has also improved and changed the Airmatic pump over the course of time. The AIRMATIC struts are controlled by the N51 Air Suspension Control Unit (N51) and there is also a level sensor that tells the level. Airmatic allows a W220 to be lowered or raised by about 2 cm, for example, it lowers at high speeds for a lower center of gravity. The Airmatic system was supported by the ADS, active damping system.

The lower control arm in the previous S-Class was switched to a spring link and torque strut.

On the instrument cluster multi-function display, the AIRMATIC warning message says "AIRMATIC", "VISIT WORKSHOP!" with an graphic of a car with a little arrow pointing up when it may have issues.

Active Body Control
Some models had a hydropneumatic suspension system, Active Body Control or ABC. The ABC system on the 1998-2005 S-Class used hydropneumatic suspension struts.

ABC was standard on the S 55 AMG (supercharged) and S 600 (biturbo), while being an optional upgrade on other S-Class models.

Features

As with each new S-Class, the W220 was technologically advanced at the time of its launch, bringing in new innovations such as Airmatic air suspension, Active Ventilated Seats (which used miniature fans in the seats to move air through perforations), keyless entry and ignition, Distronic: the first worldwide radar-assisted Autonomous cruise control system, and a cylinder deactivation system called Active Cylinder Control for the S 500 and S 600 models, which improves fuel consumption and reduces emissions. All were pioneering innovations at the time of the W220's conception. There are standard features to all models, standard features to certain models, and finally optional features. Sometimes what is standard changes on a model year or country of sale.

4Matic all wheel drive was introduced to the North American S-Class for 2003, for the S 430 and S 500 as a US$2180 option. This full-time system splits engine power 40/60 front/rear, with electronic traction control adjusting that mix to the wheels (or wheel) with the best traction in slippery conditions.

It was the first Mercedes with curtain airbags (previewed by the F200 concept in 1996).

Details on some of the safety, comfort, and technological features are as follows:

Safety
Despite a wide range of safety technology, and being marketed for its safety, one Canadian website said W220 S-Class had not actually been tested by the Insurance Institute for Highway Safety, the National Highway Traffic Safety Administration, or Euro NCAP, or at least the information was not available. However, another website says that the W220 passed the legally prescribed EU front and side impact tests. Increased attention to side impacts was noted, and the car included a window air bag that inflates between the A and C pillars.

Passive safety features include various frames and bulkheads made out of aluminum and/or high-strength steel. Also the front and rear ends include aluminum crash boxes can be replaced as separate units to reduce the cost of repairs. Despite its price German insurance companies put it in the lower bracket because it was easier to repair.

Pre-Safe, the integrated Mercedes-Benz collision avoidance and response system, debuted with the W220 S-Class facelift in late 2002.
Electronic Stability Program (ESP) and Brake Assist were standard features for difficult driving conditions and emergency maneuvers.
The W220 S-Class added standard front and rear side curtain airbags. In total, the W220 features 8 airbags: 2 frontal (driver and passenger), 4 side airbags (one in each door) and 2 window-airbags.
 LED brake lights were also standard issue on the W220. LED brake lights illuminate faster than conventional bulbs.

Comfort and convenience
Features varied depending on locality (e.g. North American version) and what options were equipped
Distronic cruise control, which could maintain a set distance between the S-Class and any vehicle in front.
Speedtronic adjustable speed limiter for not exceeding a set speed on roads with speed limits.
Optional Keyless Go, a smart key entry and startup system.
Rain-sensing windshield wipers.
Light sensors to turn the headlights on and off automatically, depending on lighting circumstances. The instrument display and the COMAND screen's backlight and colour also adjust automatically depending on the ambient light situation.
Parktronic visual and audible parking aid, with sensors in the front and rear bumpers. Also, the passenger side mirror can swivel down automatically when engaging reverse, to help see the curb.
Automatically heated exterior mirrors.
Fully automatic climate control system with pollen and charcoal filters and optional separate rear-seat climate controls. The system features a sensor that is able to detect the sun's position. This allows for individually variable system adjustments based where the sun's rays are most intense. 
COMAND system combines the controls for audio systems, the television, the navigation and the telephone. COMAND based cars offer higher quality audio compared to the Audio 10 system.
Optional BOSE sound system.
Summer Open/Close - Ability to open and close all four windows and the sunroof at the same time upon entry and/or exit from the vehicle.
Self opening and closing trunk.
Self-closing doors via pneumatic system.
Electrically adjustable seats are standard. Optional were the memory function for the seats (standard in many countries on the larger engine models) and the multi-contour backrests with massage function.
Easy entry/exit function.
Auto-dimming interior and driver's side exterior rear view mirrors to prevent being dazzled by cars behind.
Xenon headlamps (bi-xenons starting from late 2002 facelift. These provide HID xenon lighting for both low and high beams).
Linguatronic voice recognition system which can be used to control the audio system, navigation system, and a cellular telephone through voice commands.

The Linguatronic voice control was introduced as an option in 1996 on the W140 S-Class. At that time it was primarily for controlling the car phone, and could understand 30 words. The second generation of this system was introduced in 2000. On the W220 this second generation system could understand more words and control more systems, such as the radio. In 2000, it could understand 300 words and control certain features on the phone, radio, CD player, and other systems. The second generation system needed 20 times the memory of the first generation system (from about half megabyte to twenty megabytes). The algorithms used in the system were developed at Ulm, Germany where what was then called DaimlerChrysler Research and Technology center was located in addition to other groups within the company. The system listens to the person's voice and records frequencies which are then analyzed by a computer and its software. The system looks for patterns called phonemes to understand what the person is saying, a process which it computes in milliseconds.

What system the voice command can control can depend on the model year. In 2000, it could control the car phone, the radio, and the CD player (if installed) but in 2002 the navigation system was also added to its domain. An original goal of the Linguatronic system was to allow essentially hands-free control of interior systems, especially the car phone by using spoken words. This means there is microphone (located in the W220 S-Class) that can listen to the person; one of the issues is hearing the person over background noises and echos. The Linguatronic system used digital pre-processing to support this task. The features is run from hardware in a separate box in the back of the car.

Suspension technologies
The W220 featured two new suspension systems - an air suspension and a hydropneumatic suspension system.

The Airmatic air system has an Adaptive Damping System (ADS) which adjusts the shock absorbers to difficult road conditions. Drivers can select a comfort or two sports suspension programmes as well as increased ride height (+25 mm) via switches on the dash. The increased ride height is automatically canceled after 5 minutes of 55 MPH driving or manually through driver's input.

The electronically controlled hydropneumatic Active Body Control (ABC) system is technically more advanced than Airmatic and keeps the car level even in fast corners, provides a comfort and sports setting. Also, just like Airmatic equipped vehicles, the ride height can be raised by using a button (2 settings, compared with Airmatic's single setting), increasing ground clearance for driving on difficult terrain such as roads with deep ruts or snow. Prior to September 2002, only higher end models (e.g. S 600, which only was available with ABC) lowered themselves automatically at higher speeds by 15 mm in order to achieve greater stability (lower center of gravity) as well as better fuel efficiency through a slightly improved aerodynamic drag coefficient. As of September 2002 all models, regardless of engine and drivetrain type (ABC or Airmatic) were able to do so as well. Furthermore, at highway speeds the suspension computer automatically engages sport mode (Airmatic - Sport mode 1 or 2 depending on the current speed), thus aiding safety by significantly reducing body roll in sharp turns.

Variation in features

There was a set of standard features, then differences between models other than just the engine, and then also various options that could be added to any given model.

The basic model had Calyptus wood (possibly Eucalyptus), the S 500 added burl walnut trim Walnut tree, the Designo Espresso edition had Elm wood trim, and the Designo Silver edition had Maple wood trim.

Major features: 5G-Tronic transmission, Airmatic Air Suspension with Adaptive Damping System (ADS), Electronic Stability Program (ESP), Automatic Slip Control (ASR), Leather Upholstery, 14 Way Power Driver and Front Passenger Seats, each with 3 Position Memory, 4-way (tilt/telescoping) power steering column, Dual Zone Climate Control (for driver and front passenger) but also separate vents for rear passengers, Hand-polished Calyptus wood trim on dash, console, doors and shift gate, COMAND data system (integrates audio, phone, navigation control), Bose AM/FM stereo/weatherband radio, concealed autoreverse cassette player, and controls for CD changer and phone with a color-LCD in-dash screen, CD navigation system (integrated with COMAND), TeleAid telecommunications service, Pneumatic door and trunk closing assist (this does not close from fully open), headlamp high pressure washers, power retractable mirrors, Front and rear ventilated disc brakes
The S 500, besides switching the engine added Nappa leather, a heated front seat, walnut wood trim, and Xenon high beam lights.
The S 600's major change was the V-12, however it also included a range of other options, including an increased amount of leather on the interior, 4 heated and powered seats, four-zone (as opposed to two zone) climate control, parktronic (an object detection/warning feature) Many of these were offered as independent on options on other models also.
Some major S-class options included Active Body Control, Keyless Go, Tire pressure monitoring system, and Electronic trunk closer, Designo and AMG packages, and various interior packages especially for seats and climate options

Examples of stock exterior paint colors/names offered included (in this case for the '06 S 65): Alabaster White, Almandine Black Metallic, Black, Black Opal Metallic, Bordeaux Red Metallic, Brilliant Silver Metallic, Capri Blue Metallic, Desert Silver Metallic, Everest Green Metallic, Flint Grey Metallic, Granite Grey Metallic, Horizon Blue Metallic, Midnight Blue, Obsidian Black, Pewter Metallic, Designo Graphite, Designo Mocha Black Metallic

Designo editions
The S-Class had two special design editions that were available for different drivetrains, it was trim and feature option set and the two choices were Designo Espresso and Designo Silver. Both included many interior trim items, like a wood shift knob, Alcantara headliner, and leather trim.

The Designo Espresso edition had Elm wood trim, and the Designo Silver edition had Maple wood trim. There were two Designo exterior paint options, designo Graphite and designo Mocha Black Metallic. The Espresso edition featured the Mocha paint, napa leather, and elm wood.

Integrated car phone systems
Phone systems offered during its model run include the Motorola Startac, carried over from W140 and offered in the first model year but replaced by the Mercedes-Benz/Motorola Timeport. Later, Mercedes-Benz offered the Motorola V60 as the car phone.

The "Timeport" phone with a voice control system was offered as an option on the Mercedes-Benz S-Class. The Timeport phone was similar to a Motorola Startac. In 2000, Mercedes and telecommunications and electronics company Motorola announced they would offer the Timeport cell phone system on all models in the year 2001. The Timeport cell-phone was a jointly developed and became available on all of Mercedes 2001 models (including the 2001 W220 S-Class) The Timeport phone was integrated with S-Class systems, major features included Voice-control and automatic mutein of the radio when accepting an incoming call (or tape or CD player). Another feature was that the directory of numbers in the phone could be downloaded to the car, and shown on the in-car display. Even though the phone was integrated as a system with car, it was portable handset that could be removed from the car. The cell-phone had an electro-luminescent Organic display with multiple colors available. The Mercedes-Benz Timeport phones were the only ones in the StarTac family to have the organic-luminescent display. (see also OLED) Another set of phones that the S-Class used were the Nokia 6150, Nokia 6210, Nokia 6310, and Nokia 6310i. These phones worked with S-Class equipped with D2B data communication system (another later system was the UHI).

As the years passed, various ways to connect different phones or systems to the COMAND or interface with existing cradles came to market, of varying ability and expense there is the issues of handling a connection to the system and then the software needed interface, and this task is affected by the model year and equipment options of any particular S-Class. One of the major advancements in this period was Bluetooth, and many modern updates are oriented towards this wireless data connection technology.

One option is the use a "puck" which plugs into the existing hardware, and engages the COMAND computer/software like an original device, but can talk to a modern device on the "other side" typically via Bluetooth. The advantage of using a puck in this style is it means the existing cradle and/or cabling has to be changed but still allows connecting with a variety of different devices, especially a wide-variety of "smart-phones"  that became popular in the decade after the W220.

Engines
The W220 was available with more engine options than the W126 or W140. The range started with a smaller 2.8L  V6 motor. Very popular was the 3.2L  V6, which was superseded by an enlarged 3.7L  V6 in the S 350. Despite their popularity, the 6-cylinder S-Class cars were not imported into countries such as the United States until model year 2006 with the S 350 (short wheelbase), where Daimler was then testing the market demand for a V6 S-Class.

The S 430, the only United States market S-Class available with both a short wheelbase ('03-'06) as well as a long wheelbase, was that region's most popular model and powered by a 4.3L  V8 that avoided the federal government's Gas Guzzler Tax of $1000. The S 500 was powered by a 5.0L  V8.

The S 55 AMG ('01-'02) was outfitted with a 5.4L  V8 motor while the later versions ('03-'06) sported the same motor, but supercharged to a rated . The S 600 ('01-'02) was outfitted with a 5.8L  V12 engine while the later versions ('03-'06) sported a twin-turbocharged (or Bi-Turbo)  5.5L V12. Both S 55 AMG and S 600 have same engine output but target different clientele: the former more sporty and responsive while the latter more luxurious with a smoother ride.

For one month in 2001, AMG produced the S 63 AMG, which was sold in very limited numbers. The S 63 was powered by a naturally aspirated 6.3L  V12. It was only offered with a long wheelbase and with rear-wheel drive. A total of 70 cars were sold exclusively through AMG in European and Asian markets.

S 65 AMG was introduced in 2005 with new enlarged 6-litre V12 engine developed specifically for Maybach 57S and 62S (as to amortise the cost of engine development). S 65 AMG became the most powerful S-Class ever built with incremental power increase for W222 S 65 AMG in 2017.

The S 320 CDI was initially fitted with a  ||  engine, which was upgraded in late 2002 to a  ||  one. The S 400 CDI had  at first, but got  in 2003. The type designation S 400 CDI was changed in the W221 generation to S 420.

W220 was the first generation of S-Class, where automatic transmissions were standard on all models.  At first, all cars had 5-speed 5G-Tronic transmission; however, since 2003 (2004 in the United States), S 430 and S 500 were instead offered with the new 7-speed 7G-Tronic transmission.

Transmission
All model years used a 5-speed transmission until a 7-speed came out. In the U.S. market, the 7 speed was the standard transmission on RWD S 430 and S 500 models in 2004, and optional on 4MATIC models. V12 models continued using the 5-speed as the 7-speed could not handle the immense amount of torque from the V12. In 2005, the 7-speed was standard on the S430 4MATIC, making it no longer optional. The transmission has W and S modes that can be selected.

See also: Mercedes-Benz 5G-Tronic transmission and Mercedes-Benz 7G-Tronic transmission

Certificates and reports
In 2005, the S-Class was the first vehicle to receive a TÜV Institute environmental certificate from the German Commission on Technical Compliance for environmentally friendly components. The improved environmental efficiency of the W220 manufacture process was judged approvingly.

Edmunds gave the S-Class a 5 out of 5 reliability rating and MSN Autos assign an expert rating of 9.0 out of 10. By March 2011, Consumer Reports had changed its reliability ratings for the 2001 and 2002 S-Class as having improved to "average". Build quality was generally considered to be good. For instance, Forbes described the W220 S 500 as "built remarkably well." Early W220s were recalled for issues with the trunk spring and the hydraulic fuel line; there were no recalls for the 2005 or 2006 model years.

Recalls
In 2006, nearly 24,000 (95%) S-Class sold in China between late 1998 and early 2005 were recalled due to a fuel tank defect. The recall was limited to the S-Class cars sold in China; S-Class models sold elsewhere were unaffected.

In 2006, a recall was initiated due to illumination failures in the instrument cluster of some W220s.

Examples of recalls in Australia include:
2000, a recall for the heater blower overheating issue
2004, for the V12 with ABC hydraulic line 
2004, for a Blower fuse overheating in certain hot conditions
2007, an ABC hydraulic line could leak near hot engine components

Some other issues were noted with sensors or other components being potentially being damaged by water and/or heat. The model is also called the V220 (as opposed to W220).

Maintenance/design features
One Canadian car site noted that older W220's can offer impressive features for the cost, provided that owners continue to maintain the vehicle. They noted a few key issues on later models including the air suspension and interior electronics. They also noted that over its production run Mercedes-Benz fixed many issues and there is also considerable variation in models depending how they were equipped.

Reed valve inside air/water duct: the Ventilation drain
One critical maintenance issue is the main ventilation drain (these are below the vents at the back of the hood/bonnet and below the windshield). If this drain becomes clogged such as from leaves or snow it can overflow, flooding the passenger compartment. When it overflows in can short out wiring in the car. There is an air and water vent on the right (passenger side) near the base of the windshield, under the hood, which among other features as a drain with a reed valve to allow water to drain out.

This issue was the subject of a Class-action lawsuit in the U.S. State of California.

In 2010, the United States Judge Howard Matz ruled on the settlement about this issue.

The air/water duct is drained by a reed valve, which if clogged can cause water to overflow into the passenger compartment. Other things that can cause water to enter an S-Class interior include the air conditioning condensation drain tubes.

The permanent solution to prevent water from flooding the interior is to simply to remove the reed valve in the cowling drain so the water can flow straight and through the drain.

Performance
About top speeds: The top speed of most models was limited to no more than 156 mph if it could be achieved, some models such as the CDI were slower.

2004 S 500 
0- 6.0 s to 6.2 s
Quarter mile 14.3 s
2001 S 500 with Sport package
0- 5.9 s
Quarter mile 14.2 s
2001 Mercedes S 600 
0- 5.3 s
0- 4.5 s (2003)
Quarter mile 13.7 s
2003 S 55
0- 4.5 s
2001 S 320 CDI
 0- 7.9 seconds
2001 S 430
0- 7.0 seconds

Aftermarket and tuner

The naturally aspirated V-8 was boosted by up to 30 hp, but the turbo and super-charged version was boosted 100-120 hp by reputable tuning companies. An additional 200 hp could be achieved with extensive modifications going as far as improved heat management and modifications to the intercooler for the M275 V-12 twin-turbo. Potential points of modification include intake, exhaust, fuel systems, transmissions, and the ECU.

An example of an aftermarket version of the S-Class, was the 2001 Brabus S V12. This increased the displacement of the engine to 6.7 liters and the horsepower to 450. The changes also included interior luxury options like the BRABUS PC, enhanced leather trim options, and a 12-inch TFT (flat screen) display. The Brabus S V12 cost US$416,000 (416,000 DM) and needed any stock MB S 600 for the conversion. The Brabus had a top speed of almost 190 mph and various other changes, including different tires and rims (on the front 50.8 x 24.1 cm / 20.0 x 9.5 with 245/35ZR-20, and on the rear 50.8 x 24.1 cm / 20.0 x 9.5 also with 245/35ZR-20).

examples
Kleemann S 60
Kleemann also produced a limited slip differential for the W220 S-Class and some related models.
Wald S-Class versions incl. black bison version
Brabus S-Class version
2001 Brabus S V12 
Brabus V-12 engine kit 
See Brabus#Mercedes-Benz S-Class

Related vehicles

Mercedes-Benz CL-Class (C215) Shorter coupe version of W220 shared many components and features from the sedan, albeit a completely unique aluminium & composite body construction riding on an 8 inch shorter wheelbase, with ABC suspension as standard equipment. V8 and V12 engines with their respective model nomenclature were carried over to the a 2-door coupe, no diesel or V6 options were available.

Chrysler LX platform (reused some W220 suspension components from 2005) (note: Chrysler was part of Daimler during much of this period (1998-2007), and there were many cross brand standardizations)
2004 Kleemann S60 (see also Kleemann)
Misc. tuner versions from Brabus, Kleeman, Wald, etc.

See also
Comand APS (Cockpit Management and Data system)
Daimler-Chrysler
List of Mercedes-Benz vehicles
https://w220.wiki/ (A detailed encyclopedia on the vehicle systems, and repair guides)

References

Notes

Bibliography

General

Workshop manuals

External links

S500 Gallery - FamilyCar.com

W220 S Class Encyclopedia - benzworld.org
2002 S500 with AMG package review
2004 S-class family manual

W220
W220
Cars introduced in 1998
2000s cars
All-wheel-drive vehicles
Rear-wheel-drive vehicles
Full-size vehicles
Luxury vehicles
Sedans
Limousines